The NASA Infrared Telescope Facility (NASA IRTF) is a  telescope optimized for use in infrared astronomy and located at the Mauna Kea Observatory in Hawaii. It was first built to support the Voyager missions and is now the US national facility for infrared astronomy, providing continued support to planetary, solar neighborhood, and deep space applications. The IRTF is operated by the University of Hawaii under a cooperative agreement with NASA.  According to the IRTF's time allocation rules, at least 50% of the observing time is devoted to planetary science.

Telescope

 

The IRTF is a 3.0 m (118" effective aperture) classical Cassegrain telescope.  The Cassegrain focus f/ratio is f/38 and the primary mirror f/ratio is 2.5.  Several aspects of the design of IRTF are optimized for IR observations.  The secondary mirror is undersized to prevent the instrument from seeing the thermal emission from the telescope structure around the primary mirror.  The primary mirror itself is 126" in diameter, but only the center 118" is used.  A small mirror in the center of the secondary mirror prevents the instrument from seeing its own thermal emission.  The f/ratio is long to have a small secondary mirror, again to minimize the telescope's thermal emission.  The mirror coatings are chosen to have minimal thermal emission.  The emissivity of the telescope is usually below 4%.  The secondary mirror is mounted on a chopping mechanism to rapidly switch the pointing of the telescope from target to sky at up to 4 Hz.

The IRTF is mounted on a large English yoke equatorial mount.  The mount is very stiff, reducing flexure and allowing for accurate pointing of the telescope.  Since the telescope is on an equatorial mount, the telescope can observe targets through the zenith without concern for field rotation.  The yoke mount prevents the telescope from pointing north of +69 degrees declination.  Since the telescope was primarily intended for planetary science, this restriction was considered to be acceptable.  Since the telescope is on a heavy mounting, it is relatively immune from vibration or wind shake.

Instrumentation
The IRTF hosts four facility instruments: SpeX, NSFCam2, iSHELL, and MIRSI.    IRTF also hosts a number of visiting instruments.

SpeX
SpeX is a medium-resolution 0.8-5.4 µm spectrograph built at the Institute for Astronomy (IfA), for the NASA Infrared Telescope Facility (IRTF) on Mauna Kea. The primary scientific driver of SpeX was to provide maximum simultaneous wavelength coverage at a spectral resolving power which is well-matched to many planetary, stellar and galactic features, and at resolving power which adequately separates sky emission lines and disperses sky continuum. This requirement has resulted in an instrument which provides spectral resolutions of R~1000-2000 across 0.8-2.4 µm, 2.0-4.1 µm, and 2.3-5.5 µm, using prism cross-dispersers (15 arcsec-long slits). Single order long slit (60 arcsec) modes are also available. A high throughput prism mode is a provided for 0.8-2.5 µm spectroscopy at R~100 for solid state features and SEDs. A Raytheon Aladdin 3 1024x1024 InSb array is used in the spectrograph.  SpeX also contains an infrared slit-viewer/guider covering a 60x60arcsec field-of-view at 0.12arcsec/pixel. A Raytheon Aladdin 2 512x512 InSb array in the infrared slit-viewer.  The infrared slit viewer can also be used for imaging or photometry.  SpeX is used for a wide array of planetary and astrophysical research programs, and is the most requested instrument on IRTF.  SpeX will be taken off of the telescope for about 6 months to upgrade its arrays starting in August 2012.

iSHELL
iSHELL is a 1 - 5.3 µm high resolution cross-dispersed echelle spectrograph which uses a 2048x2048 Hawaii-2RG infrared detector array.  It replaced CSHELL; by using a larger array and a cross disperser, iShell has much larger wavelength coverage per setting than did CSHELL. iShell uses a silicion immersion grating to achieve a high dispersion with a relatively small grating, which in turn allows the optics and the whole instrument to be much smaller than if it used a conventional grating.  Thus despite having much higher spectral resolution than SpeX, iShell will be slightly smaller.  There will be two immersion gratings, one optimized for K band and one optimized for L band.  Due to the silicon grating, iShell will not be sensitive to light shorter than 1  µm.  Each pixel is 0.125" on the sky and the spectroscopic dispersion is 75,000 when used with a 0.375" slit.  Five slits from 0.375" to 4.0" are available for use.  iSHELL also has an IR imaging mode and IR guiding camera, which covers a 42" diameter field.  As of 2019, iSHELL was the second-most heavily used instrument at IRTF (after SpeX).

MIRSI
MIRSI is a 2.2 to 25 µm thermal infrared imaging camera with grism spectrographic capability.  MIRSI was built by Boston University and is now based at the IRTF.  It is the only facility instrument that is cooled by liquid Helium, and the only instrument that uses the chopping mode of the secondary mirror.  MIRSI has a selection of broad-band and narrow-band filters, as well as a CVF.

MORIS
MORIS (MIT Optical Rapid Imaging System) s a high-speed, visible-wavelength camera for use on IRTF using an electron multiplying CCD.  MORIS is mounted on the side window of SpeX, and is fed by the internal cold dichroic in SpeX. The design is based on POETS (Portable Occultation, Eclipse, and Transit Systems), which were developed by a collaboration between MIT and Williams College.  MORIS is available for open use on IRTF and its user interface has been converted to the IRTF standard interface.  In addition to visible light photometry, MORIS is also used as a visible light guider for SpeX, allowing guiding on targets as faint as V=20.  The guiding software includes atmospheric dispersion correction to move the visible light guide box to keep the IR image on the SpeX slit.

Visiting instruments
IRTF also hosts a number of visitor instruments, usually thermal infrared spectrographs.  These have recently included TEXES, EXES, BASS, and HIPWAC. And others.

Future instruments
The IRTF staff are currently developing SPECTRE, an optical-to-infrared seeing-limited integral field unit.

Past instruments
CSHELL was retired when iSHELL began operations at IRTF. CSHELL was a 1 - 5.5 µm high resolution single-order echelle spectrograph which uses a 256 x 256 pixel InSb detector array.  Each pixel was 0.2" on the sky and the spectroscopic dispersion is 100,000 per pixel.  Slits from 0.5" to 4.0" provided spectral resolutions of up to 30,000.  CSHELL also had an IR imaging mode for source acquisition which covers a 30" x 30" field.  An internal CCD with a 1' FOV allows for guiding.

NSFCAM2 was a 1-5 µm camera, built at the Institute for Astronomy, (IfA), for the NASA Infrared Telescope Facility (IRTF). The camera used a 2048x2048 Hawaii 2RG detector array. The image scale was 0.04 arcsec/pixel and the field of view is 82x82 arcsec. It contained two filter wheels. The first was a 28 position wheel containing broad-band and narrow-band filters, and a wire-grid polarizer. The second contained a 1.5-5 µm CVF and grisms. for low-resolution spectroscopy. A third wheel, located at the F/38 telescope focal plane inside the camera, contained grism slits and field lenses.  An external wheel containing a waveplate could be used with a polarizer in the CVF wheel for polarimetry.  NSFCam2 was taken off of the telescope in Fall 2012 to upgrade its array to a higher quality engineering grade Hawaii 2RG array with a new array controller. As of 2019, NSFCam2 is no longer available for use at the IRTF.

Remote observing
The majority of IRTF users prefer to use IRTF remotely.  Observers can use IRTF from any location with a high speed internet connection, such as their office or home, anywhere around the world.  The observer controls the instrument via a VNC session, just as they would at the summit, and communicates with the telescope operator via phone, Polycom, or Skype.  The observer calls in and logs in for their time allocation.  Remote observing has several advantages.  Remote observing spares the observer the time and cost of traveling from their home institution to Hawaii.  In the past, when observers traveled to the telescope, the telescope was scheduled in full nights.  With remote observing, observers only need to submit a request for the amount of time they need, when they need it, instead of asking for whole nights.  Since the observers do not travel to Hawaii, they can also request to use the telescope more frequently.  This has enabled the IRTF to support many programs where frequent observations of targets are necessary, such as weekly monitoring of solar system objects.  Remote observing has also allowed the IRTF to support target-of-opportunity (ToO) programs.  These are programs of high scientific merit where the timing of the observation cannot be predicted at the time that telescope is scheduled.  Examples include supernovae, which explode unexpectedly, or near-earth asteroids that may be discovered shortly before their closest approach to the Earth.  Although the observers are usually remote, the telescope operator is at the summit to ensure the safety of the facility, assist the observer, and troubleshoot problems that may arise during the night.

Observations
NASA's Infrared Telescope Facility  (IRTF) also made observations of P/2016 BA14, which is a comet that came within about 9 lunar distances of Earth in 2016.

Comparison to contemporaries
NASA IRTF was built at the same time as the United Kingdom Infrared Telescope; John Jefferies of the Institute for Astronomy, which built the first telescope in the area, said "it has been sometimes a source of embarrassment ... that there are two of them at the same place at the same time. The natural question is asked, Why two? Why don't you build one and share it?".

Dedicated infrared telescopes require a high and dry location, special instrumentation, and similar high-quality mirrors and optics as for visible wavelength observations. Other large optical infrared and near-infrared telescopes circa 1980:

There have been two other smaller near-infrared telescopes: the  Gornergrat Infrared Telescope in the Swiss Alps, and the  telescope at the Mont Mégantic Observatory in Canada.

Location

See also 

 List of largest optical reflecting telescopes
 List of largest infrared telescopes

References

External links 
 NASA Infrared Telescope Facility homepage

Infrared telescopes
Astronomical observatories in Hawaii
Buildings and structures in Hawaii County, Hawaii